Concept S may refer to:

 Lamborghini Concept S, a 2005 concept car based on the ' Lamborghini Gallardo '
 Rimac Concept S, a derivative of the ' Rimac Concept One '

See also
 Concept (disambiguation)
 S (disambiguation)